Waterford Union High School, more commonly known as Waterford High School, is a public high school located in Waterford, Racine County, Wisconsin.

It is a part of the Waterford Union School District. A part of the district extends into Vernon, Waukesha County.

Athletics 
Waterford Union High School offers twenty different sports with a total of 48 teams in various sports such as basketball, cross-country, football, gymnastics, soccer and tennis. The school's athletic teams compete in the Southern Lakes Conference.

Notable alumni 
 Sam Alvey - MMA fighter
 Scott Gunderson - State politician

References

External links 
 Waterford Union High School website

Public high schools in Wisconsin
Schools in Racine County, Wisconsin